Philippe Graffin (born 1964 in Romilly-sur-Seine) is a French violinist.

References

External links
Hyperion Records
Caroline Baird Artists

1964 births
Living people
People from Romilly-sur-Seine
20th-century French male classical violinists
21st-century French male classical violinists